The Business Language Testing Service (BULATS) was an English language test provided by Cambridge English Language Assessment. It has been officially retired on 6 December 2019. 
It assesses the level of a person in a used language and in a professional context. This foreign language skills assessment is validated by a two-years valid certificate. The languages evaluated are English, German (in collaboration with the Goethe-Institut), Spanish (in collaboration with the University of Salamanca) and French (in collaboration with the Alliance Française).

It's an online test that gives a score between 0 and 100, giving a direct equivalence with the Common European Framework of Reference for Languages levels.

References

Standardized tests for English language
English-language education
University of Cambridge examinations